The Lely Juno family is a family of robot series produced by Excel Dairy Services, headquartered in the Netherlands. The robots' main function and purpose is to provide labor on farms such as supplying food to cows on farms and milking them.

The robots come in various models, including Juno 100 and Juno 150.

References

External links
Lely Juno on Lely company's main website. 
Lely Expands Line with New Automatic Feed Pusher, Juno 100
The Lely Juno 100: A Dairy Farmer’s Faithful Sidekick

Dairy farming technology
Agricultural robotics